Klubi Futbollistik Skënderbeu Korçë B is the reserve team of KF Skënderbeu Korçë. The team is currently not competing in the any football league.

References

External links
Official Website 
Albanian Football Association Official Website 
KF Skënderbeu at UEFA.com 

KF Skënderbeu Korçë
Football clubs in Albania
Association football clubs established in 1909
Association football clubs established in 2015
Korçë
Reserve team football in Albania
Albanian Third Division clubs